STAGA complex 65 subunit gamma is a protein that in humans is encoded by the SUPT7L gene.

Model organisms 

Model organisms have been used in the study of SUPT7L function. A conditional knockout mouse line, called Supt7ltm1a(EUCOMM)Wtsi was generated as part of the International Knockout Mouse Consortium program — a high-throughput mutagenesis project to generate and distribute animal models of disease to interested scientists.

Male and female animals underwent a standardized phenotypic screen to determine the effects of deletion. Twenty four tests were carried out on mutant mice and two significant abnormalities were observed. No homozygous mutant embryos were identified during gestation, and therefore none survived until weaning. The remaining tests were carried out on heterozygous mutant adult mice but no further abnormalities were observed.

Interactions 

SUPT7L has been shown to interact with TAF9 and Transcription initiation protein SPT3 homolog.

References

Further reading 

 
 
 
 

Genes mutated in mice